Joel Inez "Sailor" Newkirk (June 1, 1896 – January 22, 1966) was a pitcher in Major League Baseball. He played for the Chicago Cubs.

Life
Newkirk was born in Kyana, Indiana, the son of Caleb Wilson Newkirk (1875-1945) and his wife, Sarah Florence (nee Ray) Newkirk (1878-1961). His younger brother is former Major League Baseball pitcher Floyd Newkirk. Joel served as a Boatswain Mate 1st Class in the United States Naval Reserve during World War I. This is likely what gave him the nickname "Sailor." 

He married Vivian Capitola Stiles (1900-1974) and they had one daughter, Betty Joel Newkirk Westfall (1921-1996).

Newkirk is a descendant of Sergeant Elias Newkirk, who served in the American Revolutionary War, and whose family was among the earliest settlers to Ulster County, New York. Elias's brother, Abraham, was a direct ancestor of Steve Comer, another Major League pitcher, and actor Dash Mihok; this makes both Comer and Mihok 5th cousins, twice removed of Joel.

Joel is buried at Wolf Creek Cemetery in Eldorado, Illinois, where he passed away.

References

External links

1896 births
1966 deaths
Major League Baseball pitchers
Chicago Cubs players
Columbus Senators players
Wichita Falls Spudders players
Baseball players from Indiana